The Fontan procedure or Fontan–Kreutzer procedure is a palliative surgical procedure used in children with univentricular hearts. It involves diverting the venous blood from the inferior vena cava (IVC) and superior vena cava (SVC) to the pulmonary arteries without passing through the morphologic right ventricle; i.e., the systemic and pulmonary circulations are placed in series with the functional single ventricle. The procedure was initially performed in 1968 by Francis Fontan and Eugene Baudet from Bordeaux, France, published in 1971, simultaneously described in 1971 by Guillermo Kreutzer from Buenos Aires, Argentina, and finally published in 1973.

Indications
The Fontan Kreutzer procedure is used in pediatric patients who possess only a single functional ventricle, either due to lack of a heart valve (e.g. tricuspid or mitral atresia), an abnormality of the pumping ability of the heart (e.g. hypoplastic left heart syndrome or hypoplastic right heart syndrome), or a complex congenital heart disease where a bi-ventricular repair is impossible or inadvisable. The surgery allows blood to be delivered to the lungs via central venous pressure rather than via the right ventricle. Patients typically present as neonates with cyanosis or congestive heart failure. Fontan completion is usually carried out when the patient is 2–5 years of age, but is also performed before 2 years of age.

Contraindications
After Fontan Kreutzer completion, blood must flow through the lungs without being pumped by the heart.  Therefore, children with high pulmonary vascular resistance may not tolerate a Fontan procedure.  Often, cardiac catheterization is performed to check the resistance before proceeding with the surgery.  This is also the reason a Fontan procedure cannot be done immediately after birth; the pulmonary vascular resistance is high in utero and takes months to drop.
Fontan procedure is also contraindicated in those with pulmonary artery hypoplasia, patients with left ventricular dysfunction and significant mitral insufficiency.

Types 
There are four variations of the Fontan procedure:
 Ventricularization of the Right Atrium (The original Fontan's Technique)
 Atriopulmonary connection (the original Kreutzer's Technique)
 Intracardiac total cavopulmonary connection (lateral tunnel) (described by Marc De Leval and Aldo Castañeda, separately)
 Extracardiac total cavopulmonary connection (described by Carlo Marceletti and Francisco Puga for Heterotaxy Syndrome)

Approach

The Fontan procedure is the third procedure in the staged surgical palliation. It is performed in children born with congenital heart disease without two functional ventricles and an effective parallel blood flow circuit.

The first stage is known as the Norwood procedure. This stage can generally involves combining the pulmonary artery and aorta to form a larger vessel for blood to get to the body. An artificial tube or shunt can be placed from this larger vessel to the pulmonary arteries so that blood can get from the heart to the lungs. The wall between the left and right atrium can be removed to allow the mixing of oxygenated and de-oxygenated blood.

The second stage is called the hemi-Fontan or the Bidirectional Glenn procedure. This intermediary stage involves redirecting oxygen-poor blood from the top of the body to the lungs. The superior vena cava (SVC), which carries blood returning from the upper parts of the body, is disconnected from the heart and instead redirects the blood into the pulmonary arteries. The inferior vena cava (IVC), which carries blood returning from the lower body, continues to connect to the right atrium.

The third stage is called the Fontan procedure which involves redirecting the blood from the IVC to the lungs. At this point, the oxygen-poor blood from upper and lower body flows through the lungs without being pumped (driven only by the pressure that builds up in the veins or central venous pressure). This corrects the hypoxia and leaves the single ventricle responsible only for supplying blood to the body. There are currently three various techniques for the Fontan procedure which include: Atriopulmonary connection, lateral tunnel total cavopulmonary connection, and extracardiac conduit.

Post-operative complications
In the short term, children can have trouble with pleural effusions (fluid building up around the lungs).  This can require a longer stay in the hospital for drainage with chest tubes.  To address this risk, some surgeons make a fenestration from the venous circulation into the atrium.  When the pressure in the veins is high, some of the oxygen-poor blood can escape through the fenestration to relieve the pressure.  However, this results in hypoxia, so the fenestration may eventually need to be closed by an interventional cardiologist.

In a 2016 review, Dr. Jack Rychik, head of the Single Ventricle Survivorship Program at Children's Hospital of Philadelphia summarized the long-term consequences of Fontan circulation as an "indolent and progressive state of heart failure" with predictable long-term consequences on several organ systems. Chronic venous hypertension from the stasis and lowered cardiac output are assumed to be at the root of lymphatic complications such as chylothorax, protein losing enteropathy and plastic bronchitis. These complications may occur in the immediate post-operative period as well as in the medium and long term. New interventional and surgical strategies have been investigated to relieve the lymphatic complications associated with the Fontan circulation.  Concerns about damage to the liver have emerged more recently, as the Fontan circulation produces congestion and lymphedema in this organ. This can lead towards progressive hepatic fibrosis and other complications of Fontan-Associated Liver Disease. Screening protocols and treatment standards are emerging in the light of these discoveries.

Because of structural and electrochemical changes related to scarring after the procedure, arrhythmias are common. Pacemakers are placed in as many as 7% of patients who undergo the Fontan procedure. While the need for pacemakers may be related to the underlying cardiac anomaly, there is sufficient evidence that the surgery itself lead to the need for cardiac pacing.

The Fontan procedure is palliative — not curative — but more than 80% of the cases  can result in normal or near-normal growth, development, exercise tolerance, and good quality of life. However, 10% or more of patients may eventually require heart transplantation, and given the long-term consequences of chronic venous hypertension and insidious organ damage, freedom from morbidity is unlikely in the long term. New approaches to the management of failing Fontans or other clinical deterioration have included lymphatic decompression surgical procedures & intervention, Ventricular assist devices or other mechanical support therapies as either bridge to transplantation or destination therapies.

It is estimated in 2018 there was an 85% for a survival rate of thirty years following a Fontan procedure and there are approximately 50,000 to 70,000 people in the world with Fontan circulation.

History 

The Fontan procedure was initially described in 1971 by Dr. Francis Fontan (1929–2018) from Bordeaux, France.  Prior to this, the surgical treatment for tricuspid atresia consisted of creating a shunt between a systemic artery and the pulmonary artery (Blalock-Taussig shunt) or the superior vena cava and the pulmonary artery (Glenn shunt).  These procedures were associated with high mortality rates, commonly leading to death before the age of one year.   In an attempt to improve this, Fontan was engaged in research between 1964 and 1966 endeavouring to fully redirect flow from the superior and inferior vena cavae to the pulmonary artery. His initial attempts in dogs were unsuccessful and all experimental animals died within a few hours; however, despite these failures, he successfully performed this operation in a young woman with tricuspid atresia in 1968 with Dr Eugene Baudet. The operation was completed on a second patient in 1970, and after a third case the series was published in the international journal Thorax in 1971. Dr. Guillermo Kreutzer from Buenos Aires, Argentina (b. 1934) without any knowledge of Fontan's experience performed a similar procedure in July, 1971 without placing a valve in the Inferior Vena Cava inlet and introducing the concept of "fenestration" leaving a small atrial septal defect to serve as a pop-off valve for the circulation.

References

External links 
 

Cardiac surgery
Congenital heart defects
Pediatric surgical procedures
Thoracic surgical procedures